The Broken Pots is a 1960 Turkish drama film directed by Memduh Ün. It was entered into the 11th Berlin International Film Festival.

Cast
 Lale Oraloğlu - Sabahat
 Turgut Özatay - Cemal
 Rüya Gümüsata - Ayten
 Mualla Kaynak - Mualla
 Salih Tozan - Hüseyin, the grandfather
 Engin Deniz
 Niyazi Er
 Mahmure Handan
 Asim Nipton - The lawyer
 Adnan Uygur - Nuri, the boss
 Reha Yurdakul - Sabri

References

External links

1960 films
1960s Turkish-language films
1960 drama films
Turkish black-and-white films
Films directed by Memduh Ün
Films set in Turkey
Turkish drama films